Marko Pecarski (born February 12, 2000) is a Serbian professional basketball player for Mornar Bar of the Prva A Liga and the Adriatic League.

Early life and career 
Pecarski was born in Gijón, Spain as his father Miroslav Pecarski was playing for Gijón of the Liga ACB. Marko grew up in his hometown Belgrade, playing for the Zemun youth system. Pecarski played Euroleague Basketball Next Generation Tournaments for the Zemun (2013–2014) and the Mega Leks (2015–2016). In April 2016, he participated at 2016 Jordan Brand Classic International Game. He made his debut in the Adriatic League, on 2 May 2016, at the age of 16, in a home loss to Crvena zvezda. In January 2017, he moved to Germany to play for reserve team of Bayern Munich of the German 3rd-tier level ProB. In August 2017, he attended  Basketball Without Borders Europe Camp 16 in Netanya, Israel. Also, he attended the Basketball Without Borders Global Camp in El Segundo, California in February 2018.

Professional career
On September 25, 2017, Pecarski signed a three-year contract with Partizan from Belgrade. Over 12 ABA League games in 2017–18 season, he averaged 4.2 points and 2.6 rebounds, while shooting 71% from the field goal. In August 2019, Pecarski parted ways with Partizan. On September 20, Pecarski officially parted ways with Partizan.

On September 20, 2019, Pecarski signed a three-year contract with FMP. Following the 2020–21 season Pecarski declared for the 2021 NBA draft. On July 14, 2021, he parted ways with FMP. On July 19, he withdrawn his name from consideration for the 2021 NBA draft.

On July 27, 2021, Pecarski signed a one-year contract with Borac Čačak.

On August 9, 2022, Pecarski signed a contract with Mornar Bar.

National team career 
Pecarski was a member of the Serbia men's national under-16 teams at the two European Under-16 Championships. Over seven games at the 2016 Championship, he averaged 26.6 points, 15.9 rebounds and 0.9 assists per game and he was selected to the All-Tournament Team. He was the top scorer and the rebounds leader of the 2016 Championship. Before that, over nine games at the 2015 Championship, he averaged 12 points, 8.9 rebounds and 1.6 assists per game.

Pecarski was a member of the Serbian U-18 national basketball teams that won the gold medals at the 2017 Championship and the 2018 FIBA Europe Under-18 Championship. Over seven tournament games in 2017, he averaged 12.6 points, 8.3 rebounds and 0.7 assists per game. In 2018, he averaged 24.7 points, 11.0 rebounds and 2.3 assists per game over seven tournament games. He was the top scorer and the rebounds leader of the 2018 Championship. He was instrumental in the gold-medal game with a game-high 34 points, 13 rebounds and 1 assist, as Serbia defeated Latvia 99-90 after an excellent first-half performance. At the tournament's end, he picked up the Most Valuable Player award and got selected to the All-Tournament Team. Pecarski and Balša Koprivica played together for the national team and won a gold medal at the 2017 FIBA Europe Under-18 Championship. Thirty years ago, their fathers Miroslav Pecarski and Slaviša Koprivica played together for the national team and won a gold medal at the 1987 FIBA Under-19 World Championship.

Pecarski was a member of the Serbian under-19 team that finished 7th at the 2019 FIBA Under-19 Basketball World Cup in Heraklion, Greece. Over seven tournament games, he averaged 22.1 points and 8.6 rebounds per game. Pecarski was a member of the Serbian under-20 team that finished 15th at the 2019 FIBA U20 European Championship in Tel Aviv, Israel. Over six tournament games, he averaged 18.8 points and 8.8 rebounds per game.

Individual awards
 FIBA Europe Under-18 Championship MVP – 2018
 FIBA Europe Under-18 Championship All-Tournament Team – 2018
 FIBA Europe Under-18 Championship Top scorer – 2018
 FIBA Europe Under-18 Championship Rebounds Leader – 2018
 FIBA Europe Under-16 Championship All-Tournament Team – 2016
 FIBA Europe Under-16 Championship Top scorer – 2016
 FIBA Europe Under-16 Championship Rebounds Leader – 2016

References

External links 
 Marko Pecarski at aba-liga.com
 Marko Pecarski at draftexpress.com
 Marko Pecarski at eurobasket.com

2000 births
Living people
ABA League players
Basketball League of Serbia players
Basketball players from Belgrade
Centers (basketball)
KK Borac Čačak players
KK Mega Basket players
KK FMP players
KK Partizan players
Serbian men's basketball players
Serbian expatriate basketball people in Germany
Serbian expatriate basketball people in Montenegro
Sportspeople from Gijón
Spanish expatriate basketball people in Serbia